Abu Sa'id Aban ibn Taghlib ibn Rubah al-Kindi (died 758 AD/141 AH) was an outstanding jurist-traditionist and an associate of Muhammad al-Baqir, but also of Zayn al-Abidin and Ja'far al-Sadiq. Al-Baqir is reported to have praised Aban as, "Sit in the mosque of Kufa and give legal judgment to the people. Indeed I would like to see among my Shia, people like you."
He is considered one of the frequently quoted jurists of Ja'far's period , When he died al-Sadiq is reported to have said, "I would love to have my Shi'a like Aban b. Taghlib," and "his death grieved my heart." Aban's name appears in a good number of traditions, mostly of a practical nature.

There is no information about his birthplace but he is believed to be from Kufa. Aban devoted most of his life to Ahl al-Bayt.
He studied various branches of science, in particular hadith from them and attained a prominent position in the school of Imam al-Sadiq. Aban is famous to have quoted extensively from Imam Sadiq and it is reported that he narrated thirty thousand hadiths from him. He is also considered the most outstanding Quranic reciter and his style of Quranic recitation is very famous. He was the first person to publish a book about the meaning of the Holy Quraan which was renewed with different interpretations every year and is still used by many scholars and students even today.

He was considered a master of Quran traditions, jurisprudence, literature, syntax and philology. He was Appointed by Imam Mohammad al-Baqir to work in Medina. Shaykh Tusi has reported that Imam al-Sadiq appointed him to conduct scholarly discourse. Imam Baqir ordered him to "Sit in the Prophet’s mosque in Medina and provide answers to legal questions (wa afti ’l-nās); for I would like it to be known that people like yourself belong to my shīʿa"

Shi'ite scholars consider him reliable and the Sunni scholars such as Al-Nasa'i and Al-Dhahabi which confirmed his reliability and trustiness  in his biographical dictionary  saying "Aban ibn Taghlib the Kuffen a staunched Shi'ite but trustful, to us his trust, and to him his heresy" he also narrated that Ahmad ibn Hanbal, Yahya ibn Mu'in and Abu Hatam have confirmed him trustful. Books compiled by Aban are now missing but the books ascribed to him in the catalogues are as follows:

 Ma'ani al-Quran
 Kitab al-Qira'at
 Al-Garib fil-Quran
 Al-Fadail
 Kitab Siffin

References

 
  

Year of birth unknown
758 deaths
People from Najaf Province
Iraqi Quran reciters
Shia hadith scholars